= St. George's Monastery (Mosul) =

Monastery in Iraq

St. George's monastery
- Dayro d-Mor Georgese
- Location within Iraq

Monastery information
- Other name: Dayro d-Mor Georgese
- Order: Syriac Catholic Church, Chaldean Catholic Church
- Established: late 17th century
- Dedication: St. George
- Controlled churches: Upper church, Lower church

Architecture
- Status: re-constructed

Site
- Location: Mosul, Nineveh, Iraq
- Coordinates: 36.4097°N 43.1197°E
- Public access: Open

Dayro d-Mor Georgese is located in the city of Mosul, Northern Iraq. The Monastery is named after St. George. It was most likely built in the late 17th century. Pilgrims from different parts of the north visit it annually in spring, when many people travel to its surrounding areas on holiday.

== History ==
It is about 6 m below street level. When a modern church was built over the old one in 1931, much of its archeological significance was lost. The only monuments left are a marble door-frame decorated with a carved Estrangelo (Syriac) inscription and two niches which date back to the 13th or 14th century after the monastery was mostly destroyed by ISIS militants in 2014.

== Reconstruction ==
In late 2021, cooperation between the Iraqi and US government occurred to help reconstruct the monastery. The project was funded by the US government under the supervision of the University of Pennsylvania. Both the upper and lower churches were reconstructed as well as the main courtyard of the monastery and parts of the exterior.
